Niederweningen Dorf railway station is a railway station in the Swiss canton of Zurich and municipality of Niederweningen. The station is located close to the centre of the municipality, on the Wehntal railway line, and is served by Zurich S-Bahn line S15.

Niederweningen Dorf station was opened in 1891 as the terminus of the Swiss Northeastern Railway's Wehntal line, and was originally simply known as Niederweningen station. In 1938 the line was extended by a further  to the cantonal border and a new terminus created. The new terminus took the name of Niederweningen station, and the previous terminus became a through station by the name of Niederweningen Dorf.

Services 
The following services stop at Niederweningen:

References

External links 
 
 

Railway stations in the canton of Zürich
Swiss Federal Railways stations
Niederweningen